General Hon. John Chapple Norton (2 April 1746 – 19 March 1818) was a British Army officer who served in the American Revolutionary War and who later became a Member of Parliament for Guildford.

Early life 
John Chapple Norton was born on 2 April 1746 to Fletcher Norton, 1st Baron Grantley and Grace Chapple.

Military career 

He joined the British army, becoming  a captain in the 19th Foot in 1763. After serving with the regiment in Gibraltar he transferred to the Royal Regiment of Foot in 1769, before being appointed a lieutenant-colonel in the 2nd Foot Guards. He served with the Foot Guards in North America during the War of Independence and was involved in several of the actions there, including leading the attack on Young's House.

In 1795 he was rewarded with the colonelcy of the 81st Regiment of Foot and in 1797 promoted lieutenant-general and transferred to the colonelcy of the 56th Foot. In 1802 he was made general and soon afterwards Governor of Charlemont, the Irish fort.

Political career 

He represented Guildford, Surrey as their Member of Parliament from 1784 to 1790, from 1796 to 1806 and from 1807 to 1812.

Later life and death 

He died unmarried at the family seat of Wonersh Park in Surrey in 1818.

References

External links 
 

1746 births
1818 deaths
Younger sons of barons
56th Regiment of Foot officers
81st Regiment of Foot officers
British Army personnel of the American Revolutionary War
British Army generals
Green Howards officers
Coldstream Guards officers
Members of the Parliament of Great Britain for English constituencies
British MPs 1784–1790
British MPs 1790–1796
British MPs 1796–1800
Members of the Parliament of the United Kingdom for English constituencies
UK MPs 1801–1802
UK MPs 1802–1806
UK MPs 1807–1812